Made in the Philippines is the eighth studio album from Filipino trio Apo Hiking Society. It was released in 1985 by Universal Records.

Track listing
American Junk (3:40)
After Tonight (3:59)
Nakakagigil (4:38)
You and I (3:20)
Tuloy Ang Ikot Ng Mundo (3:36)
The Crazy One (4:19)
Oh You (3:25)
Song For A Friend (4:49)
You're Leaving Me For Someone (3:20)
Inday (3:49)

Related links
The Official Apo Hiking Society Website 

APO Hiking Society albums
1985 albums